The South African Practical Shooting Association (SAPSA) is the South African association for practical shooting under the International Practical Shooting Confederation.

See also 
 South African Handgun Championship
 South African Rifle Championship

References

External links 
 Official homepage of The South African Practical Shooting Association

Regions of the International Practical Shooting Confederation
Sports governing bodies in South Africa